The men's discus throw event at the 2004 World Junior Championships in Athletics was held in Grosseto, Italy, at Stadio Olimpico Carlo Zecchini on 16 and 18 July.  A 1.75 kg (junior implement) discus was used.

Medalists

Results

Final
18 July

Qualifications
16 July

Group A

Group B

Participation
According to an unofficial count, 25 athletes from 19 countries participated in the event.

References

Discus throw
Discus throw at the World Athletics U20 Championships